Dominic Messinger is an American television composer. He began his work in soap opera music on General Hospital, and has since composed for reality series and documentaries including Intervention, Brace for Impact, and for Nickelodeon's teen drama Hollywood Heights. He has won 14 Daytime Emmy Awards.

Composition and sound directing credits 

I'll Never Love Anyone Anymore ("Mou Daremo Aisanai") (1991)
Family Ties (1982)
Day by Day (1988)
American Families (1991)
Santa Barbara (1984–1993)
Another World (1996–1999)
Beltran, Los (1999)
Extraordinary World of Animals (1999)
One Life to Live (1999–2007)
Sunset Beach (1999)
Viva Vegas! (2000)
Spyder Games (2001)
Red Water (2003)
The Quest for Nutrition (2004)
Intervention (2006–2007)

Credits:

References

External links

Living people
American male composers
21st-century American composers
21st-century American male musicians
Year of birth missing (living people)